The Ministry of Agriculture, Agrifood, and Forestry of France is the governmental body charged with regulation and policy for agriculture, food, and forestry.

The Ministry's headquarters are in the Hôtel de Villeroy, at 78 Rue de Varenne in the 7th arrondissement of Paris, adjacent to Hotel Matignon.

Prior to 21 June 2012, the Ministry's remit was somewhat different; its full title was Ministry of Agriculture, Food, Fisheries, Rural Affairs and Spatial Planning.

The regional directorates for food, agriculture and forests (DRAAFs) oversee the implementation of policies for agriculture, food (particularly health safety), aquaculture and forests. Their missions cover the content and organisation of agricultural education. They contribute to employment policy in the fields of farming, agri-food, forestry and freshwater aquaculture.

Ministers

The Minister of Agriculture, Food, Fishing and Rural Affairs is a cabinet member in the Government of France.

Alexandre Goüin 1 March 1840 – 29 October 1840
Paul Devès 14 November 1881 – 30 January 1882
François de Mahy 30 January 1882 – 21 February 1883
Jules Méline 21 February 1883 –  6 April 1885
Hervé Mangon 6 April 1885 –  9 November 1885
Pierre Gomot 9 November 1885 –  7 January 1886
Jules Develle 7 January 1886 – 30 May 1887
François Barbe 30 May 1887 – 12 December 1887
Jules Viette 12 December 1887 – 22 February 1889
Léopold Faye 22 February 1889 – 17 March 1890
Jules Develle 17 March 1890 – 11 January 1893
Albert Viger 11 January 1893 – 26 January 1895
Antoine Gadaud 26 January 1895 –  1 November 1895
Albert Viger 1 November 1895 – 29 April 1896
Jules Méline 29 April 1896 – 28 June 1898
Albert Viger 28 June 1898 – 22 June 1899
Jean Dupuy 22 June 1899 – 7 June 1902
Léon Mougeot 7 June 1902 – 24 January 1905
Joseph Ruau 24 January 1905 – 3 November 1910
Maurice Raynaud 3 November 1910 – 2 March 1911
Jules Pams 2 March 1911 – 17 January 1913
Fernand David 21 January 1913 – 22 March 1913
Étienne Clémentel 22 March 1913 – 9 December 1913
Maurice Raynaud 9 December 1913 – 9 June 1914
Adrien Dariac 9 June 1914 – 13 June 1914
Fernand David 13 June 1914 – 29 October 1915
Jules Méline 29 October 1915 – 12 December 1916
Étienne Clémentel 12 December 1916 – 20 March 1917
Fernand David 20 March 1917 – 16 November 1917
Victor Boret 16 November 1917 – 20 July 1919
Joseph Noulens 20 July 1919 – 20 January 1920
Joseph Ricard 20 January 1920 – 16 January 1921
Edmond Lefebvre du Prey 16 January 1921 – 15 January 1922
Henry Chéron 15 January 1922 – 29 March 1924
Joseph Capus 29 March 1924 – 14 June 1924
Henri Queuille 14 June 1924 – 17 April 1925
Jean Durand 17 April 1925 – 10 April 1926
François Binet 10 April 1926 – 19 July 1926
Henri Queuille 19 July 1926 – 11 November 1928
Jean Hennessy 11 November 1928 – 21 February 1930
Henri Queuille 21 February 1930 – 2 March 1930
Fernand David 2 March 1930 – 13 December 1930
Victor Boret 13 December 1930 – 27 January 1931
André Tardieu 27 January 1931 – 14 January 1932
Achille Armand Fould 14 January 1932 – 20 February 1932
Claude Chauveau 20 February 1932 – 3 June 1932
Abel Gardey 3 June 1932 – 18 December 1932
Henri Queuille 18 December 1932 – 8 November 1934
Émile Casset 8 November 1934 – 1 June 1935
Paul Jacquier 1 June 1935 – 7 June 1935
Pierre Cathala 7 June 1935 – 24 January 1936
Paul Thellier 24 January 1936 – 4 June 1936
Georges Monnet 4 June 1936 – 18 January 1938
Fernand Chapsal 18 January 1938 – 13 March 1938
Georges Monnet 13 March 1938 – 10 April 1938
Henri Queuille 10 April 1938 – 21 March 1940
Paul Thellier 21 March 1940 – 16 June 1940
Albert Chichery 16 June 1940 – 12 July 1940
Pierre Caziot 12 July 1940 – 18 April 1942
Jacques Le Roy Ladurie 18 April 1942 – 11 September 1942
Max Bonnafous 11 September 1942 – 6 January 1944
Pierre Cathala 6 January 1944 – 20 August 1944
François Tanguy-Prigent 4 September 1944 – 22 October 1947
Marcel Roclore 22 October 1947 – 24 November 1947
Pierre Pflimlin 24 November 1947 –  2 December 1949
Gabriel Valay 2 December 1949 –  3 July 1950
Pierre Pflimlin 3 July 1950 – 11 August 1951
Paul Antier 11 August 1951 – 21 November 1951
Camille Laurens 21 November 1951 – 28 June 1953
Roger Houdet 28 June 1953 – 23 February 1955
Jean Sourbet 23 February 1955 – 1 February 1956
Roland Boscary-Monsservin 6 November 1957 – 9 June 1958
Roger Houdet 9 June 1958 – 27 May 1959
Henri Rochereau 27 May 1959 – 24 August 1961
Edgard Pisani 24 August 1961 – 8 January 1966
Edgar Faure 8 January 1966 – 10 July 1968
Robert Boulin 10 July 1968 – 16 June 1969
Jacques Duhamel 16 June 1969 – 8 January 1971
Michel Cointat 8 January 1971 – 7 July 1972
Jacques Chirac 7 July 1972 – 1 March 1974
Raymond Marcellin 1 March 1974 – 28 May 1974
Christian Bonnet 28 May 1974 – 30 March 1977
Pierre Méhaignerie 30 March 1977 – 22 May 1981
Édith Cresson 22 May 1981 – 22 March 1983
Michel Rocard 22 March 1983 – 4 April 1985
Henri Nallet 4 April 1985 – 20 March 1986
François Guillaume 20 March 1986 – 12 May 1988
Henri Nallet 12 May 1988 – 2 October 1990
Louis Mermaz 2 October 1990 – 2 October 1992
Jean-Pierre Soisson 2 October 1992 – 29 March 1993
Jean Puech 29 March 1993 – 18 May 1995
Philippe Vasseur 18 May 1995 – 4 June 1997
Louis Le Pensec 4 June 1997 – 20 October 1998
Jean Glavany 20 October 1998 – 25 February 2002
François Patriat 25 February 2002 – 7 May 2002
Hervé Gaymard 7 May 2002 – 31 March 2004
Hervé Gaymard 31 March 2004 – 29 November 2004
Dominique Bussereau 29 November 2004 – 15 May 2007
Christine Lagarde 18 May 2007 – 18 June 2007
Michel Barnier 19 June 2007 – 22 June 2009
Bruno Le Maire 23 June 2009 – 15 May 2012
Stéphane Le Foll 16 May 2012 –10 May 2017
Jacques Mézard 17 May 2017 – 19 June 2017
Stéphane Travert 21 June 2017 – 16 October 2018 
Didier Guillaume 16 October 2018 – 6 July 2020
Julien Denormandie 6 July 2020 – 20 May 2022
Marc Fesneau 20 May 2022

See also
Directorate general for Maritime affairs, Fisheries and Aquaculture

References

External links
 Ministry of Agriculture 
 Booklet in English

 
Agricultural organizations based in France
Fishing in France
Agriculture
France, Agriculture
France
1881 establishments in France
France
Forestry in France